Brian Bell (born 1968) is an American guitarist for the band Weezer.

Brian Bell may also refer to:
 Brian Bell (American football) (born 1984), American football fullback
 Brian Bell (basketball) (born 1989), American wheelchair basketball player
 Brian Bell (businessman) (1928–2010), Australian-born businessman in Papua New Guinea
 Brian Bell (ornithologist) (1930–2016), New Zealand ornithologist
 Brian Murray (actor) (1937–2018), South African actor born Brian Bell

See also
 Bryan Bell, Canadian politician